Tommy is a 1931 Soviet drama film directed by Yakov Protazanov based on the play Armoured Train 14-69 by Vsevolod Ivanov.

Plot summary

Cast
 Aleksei Temerin
 A. Zhutayev - British Soldier
 Mikhail Kedrov - Chinaman
 Vasili Kovrigin - Leader
 Vasili Vanin - Guide
 Ivan Chuvelyov - Vaska
 Nikolay Bogolyubov	
 Viktor Kulakov]
 Viktor Tsoppi		
 Vladimir Uralsky

References

External links
 
 

1931 films
Gorky Film Studio films
Soviet silent feature films
Soviet black-and-white films
Films directed by Yakov Protazanov
Soviet films based on plays
Russian Civil War films
Soviet drama films
1931 drama films
Silent drama films